Barkworth was launched in 1811 and began her career as a West Indiaman. She then made one voyage for the British East India Company (EIC). Thereafter she traded with India. She disappeared without a trace in 1824 on her way to Bombay.

Career
Barkworth appears in Lloyd's Register for 1812 with T. Forest, master, and trade Hull—London. the Register of Shipping has her sailing to the West Indies.

EIC voyage (1816–1817): Captain Thomas Lynn sailed from the Downs on 24 March 1816, bound for St Helena and China. Barkworth was at St Helena on 10 June, reached Batavia on 30 September, and arrived at Whampoa Anchorage on 7 January 1817. Homeward bound, she was off North Island (the northernmost of three islands in the bay that formed the principle anchorage of Enggano Island), on 23 March and reached St Helena on 7 June. Barkworth arrived at Northfleet on 11 August.

On 28 October 1818 Barkworth was in Madras Roads when a gale drove her and a number of other vessels out. She then stopped at Trincomalee to refit and was expected to sail to Bombay.

Lloyd's Register carries Barkworth as continuing to trade with India. Lloyd's Register for 1823 has Pedler as master and owner, and her trade as London—Bombay.

Lloyd's Register for 1824 has Barkworths master as Green, her owner as Taylor and Co., and her trade as London-Bombay. The Register of Shipping still has Pedler as master and owner, but agrees with the trade London—Bombay. It also notes that Barkworth underwent a thorough repair in 1823.

Fate
On 29 September 1824, off the Cape Verde Islands,  spoke with Barkworth, which was bound for Bombay. Cumberland arrived at Rio de Janeiro 20 October, but Barkworth was never heard from again.

Notes, citations, and references
Notes

Citations

References

1811 ships
Age of Sail merchant ships
Merchant ships of the United Kingdom
Ships of the British East India Company
Maritime incidents in 1824
Missing ships
Ships lost with all hands